The Mother's Milk Tour (also known as the Suckle Up to the Breast of Mother Earth Tour, Positive Mental Octopus Tour, The Lazy Cowgirls Tour and The Great Expectorations Tour) was a worldwide concert tour by Red Hot Chili Peppers to support their fourth studio album Mother's Milk, the breakthrough album for the band which launched them to bigger success than ever before. It was the first full tour with guitarist John Frusciante and drummer Chad Smith, who joined late in the previous year.

Background
Following the 1988 death of Hillel Slovak, departure of Jack Irons and firing of DeWayne McKnight and D.H. Peligro, Anthony Kiedis and Flea were finally able to find a lineup in late 1988 that worked for them and that would go on to create some of the band's biggest and best known albums over the next twenty years. With John Frusciante and Chad Smith on board, Mother's Milk instantly garnered more attention than the band's previous records and, as such, the venues the band performed in were able to accommodate far larger crowds. The band was now playing more arenas than ever before and gaining more television and radio exposure, especially through college radio, which was a huge supporter of the album and helped the band to eventually gain more mainstream attention. For the first time the band also upgraded to a full-fledged tour bus and added backup musicians and singers.

A VHS video documenting the tour titled Psychedelic Sexfunk Live from Heaven was released in 1990.

Songs performed

Tour overview
The tour was by far the biggest tour for the band at the time breaking them through to new audiences and larger venues to perform at. The tour also included television appearances on such shows as The Arsenio Hall Show where they even performed a tribute to the late night host called "Ode To Arsenio" which was used as an intro to their cover of Stevie Wonder's "Higher Ground". In Austin, Texas, during the opening set by Mary's Danish, all four Chili Pepper's ran onstage totally naked, and tackled Mary's Danish two female lead singers. Out of the thirteen songs on the album, only "Johnny, Kick a Hole in the Sky" has never been performed live however it was oddly placed on the band's 1992 What Hits!? album. "Show Me Your Soul", recorded in 1990 which would end up on the 1990 soundtrack for the film, Pretty Woman got a one time only lip-synch performance although it has never been performed live. The band also performed "Naked in the Rain" for the first time ever near the tour's end. The song would appear on their next album, 1991's Blood Sugar Sex Magik. In July 2017 Chad Smith told in fan interview that actually many songs from the first three records were performed during the tour and some of them were played only one time. He also mentioned that the song "Jungle Man" was also played during this tour.

This tour marked the last time "American Ghost Dance", "Baby Appeal", "Good Time Boys", "Knock Me Down", "Punk Rock Classic", "Sexy Mexican Maid", "Jungle Man", "Taste the Pain" and "True Men Don't Kill Coyotes" were performed live.

Opening acts

The Black Crowes
Buckpets
Camper van Beethoven
Cosmic Wurst
The Cramps
David St. Hubbins (introduced the band at June 16, 1990 show)
The Dead Milkmen
Exodus
Faith No More
 Fishbone
Mary's Danish
Meat Puppets
Murphy's Law

Original Sins
Pocket Fishermen
Primus
Raging Slab (December 1, 1989 Atlanta, GA, December 2, 1989, Charlotte, NC)
The Reyond
The Side Wingers
Sprawl
Suicidal Tendencies
Too Free Stooges
The Weirdos
Young Fresh Fellows

Personnel
Flea - bass, backing vocals
John Frusciante - guitar, backing vocals
Anthony Kiedis - lead vocals
Chad Smith - drums

Additional musicians
Keith "Tree" Barry - saxophone/horns, backing vocals
Kristen Vigard - backing vocals
Vickie Calhoun - backing vocals 
Robbie Allen - opening comedy act, roadie

References

External links
Red Hot Chili Peppers website
The Side: Red Hot Chili Peppers Touring History

Red Hot Chili Peppers concert tours
1989 concert tours
1990 concert tours